Hopewell is an unincorporated community in Copiah County, Mississippi, United States. Hopewell is located on the former Illinois Central Gulf Railroad.

History
Hopewell was first founded by settlers who moved to the area when a new railroad depot was built east of Ruby. The community was named Hopewell by W. T. Sandifer, Daniel Young, and a Mr. Barron.

Hopewell was home to a pharmacist in 1916.

A post office operated under the name Hopewell from 1908 to 1956.

References

Unincorporated communities in Copiah County, Mississippi
Unincorporated communities in Mississippi